Dr. Evelyn Lim is the founding dean of the Singapore Chapter of the American Guild of Organists. She has been one of the main driving forces behind the renaissance of organ music, both sacred and secular, in Singapore.

She earned her Bachelor's and Master's of Music, summa cum laude, in both Organ and Piano Performance from the University of Houston. Her Doctorate is from the University of Michigan, where she studied with the renowned Dr. Marilyn Mason. She has previously received awards including the American Guild of Organists (Houston) Memorial Prize in Organ Performance, the Power Performing Arts Award (1995) and the Palmer Christian Award.

Besides being the pipe organ master at Singapore's state of the art Esplanade - Theatres on the Bay, she also frequently performs both locally and internationally. She also accompanies the Celebration Chorus (an ecumenical community chorus), of which she is a founding member,

She teaches full-time at the Methodist School of Music and part-time at Singapore Bible College.

References

Singaporean classical organists
University of Houston alumni
University of Michigan School of Music, Theatre & Dance alumni
Living people
Year of birth missing (living people)
Women organists
21st-century organists
21st-century classical musicians
21st-century Singaporean musicians
21st-century women musicians